Fowlerville, New York may refer to:

 Fowlerville, Erie County, New York, a hamlet in Erie County, New York, United States
 Fowlerville, Livingston County, New York, a hamlet and census-designated place in Livingston County, New York, United States
 Fowlerville, Sullivan County, New York, a hamlet in Sullivan County, New York, United States